KQSF (95.7 FM, "Q95-7") is a radio station licensed to Dell Rapids, South Dakota; it serves the Sioux Falls, South Dakota area. It first began broadcasting in 1998 under the call sign KSOB. The station is currently owned by Duey E. Wright, through licensee Midwest Communications, Inc.

Its studios are located on South Phillips Avenue in Sioux Falls, while its transmitter is located near Baltic.

History
The station signed on in 1998 as KSOB with an oldies format as "Q Gold 95.7" owned by LA Media, and later changed to the KSQB call sign in 2001. KSQB was also owned by Feller Broadcasting, made up of a partnership of brothers Rob and Nick Feller. KSQB gradually tweaked to an adult contemporary format, and dropped the "Gold" from its moniker by April 1, 2004. Backyard Broadcasting acquired the station later in September 2006. With the growth of the adult hits format in 2005, Q95.7 gradually shifted to adult hits, and began reporting with the format to Arbitron by 2006.

The station was staffed by The Cartwright Brothers Morning Show (weekdays 7 to 9 a.m.) and Big Scott Allen (weekdays Noon to 6 p.m.). Big Scott was also the program director of the station.

On November 1, 2012, Midwest Communications acquired KSQB-FM and its six sister stations from Backyard Broadcasting at a purchase price of $13.35 million.

On March 1, 2013, KSQB-FM changed their call letters to KQSF, changed their format to oldies, and rebranded as "Kool 95.7" (format moved from KXQL (now KELQ) 107.9 FM, which flipped to news/talk). Mark Cartwright hosts the morning show from 6am to 9am weekdays and is the brand manager of the station. By 2014, KQSF had rebranded back to "Q95-7" and shifted to classic hits.

On September 13, 2018, at 9 a.m., after stunting with poetic readings of various song lyrics, KQSF flipped to Top 40/CHR, keeping the "Q95.7" name, to compete against the more established Top 40/CHR station KKLS-FM "Hot 104.7" and heritage Top 40/CHR station 99.7 KKCK, which then switched places with KARZ to 94.7 (which is unreceivable in Sioux Falls).

Previous logo

References

External links
Q95.7 KQSF official website

QSF
Contemporary hit radio stations in the United States
Radio stations established in 1998
Midwest Communications radio stations